Switched may refer to:

 Switched (band), an American music group
 Switched (novel), first book in the young adult Trylle series by Amanda Hocking
 Switched! (American TV series)
 Switched! (Singaporean TV series)
 "Switched" (Teen Titans), an episode of the American TV series Teen Titans
Switched (2018 TV series), Japanese-language web television/Netflix Original series